Dulal is a given name and a surname. It is a common last name in Asia, especially in Nepal, India, Pakistan and Bangladesh. In Pakistan dulal tribe is confined to the Gujar Khan Tehsil of Rawalpindi district. There are Dulal brahmans kumai jaishi and chhetri(rajput kshatriya in nepal and india).

Given name
Notable people with the given name include:
Dulal Baruah (died 2008), Indian politician
Dulal Bhuiyan, Indian politician
Dulal Biswas (born 1973), Indian footballer
Dulal Dutta (c. 1925–2010), Indian film editor 
Dulal Guha (1929–2001), Indian film director
Dulal Lahiri (born 1947), Indian film and television actor

Surname
Notable people with the surname include:
Sunita Dulal, Nepalese folk singer

Others
Dulalthok, village in Kabhre district named after Dulal surname